Bakhar is a form of historical narrative written in Marathi prose.  are one of the earliest genres of medieval Marathi literature. More than 200 bakhars were written in the seventeenth to nineteenth centuries, the most important of them chronicling the deeds of the Maratha ruler Shivaji. Bakhars are considered valuable resources depicting the Maratha view of history, but also criticized for falsification, embellishment and magnification of facts.

Etymology
Most scholars believe that the word  is a metathesis of the Arabic-origin word khabar ("information"). S N Joshi argues that the word is derived from the Persian word khair or bakhair ("all is well", the end salutation in a letter), since it appears at the end of most texts. Bapuji Sankpal argued that the word is derived from the Sanskrit-origin word akhyayika ("story") or it could be bhyaakh ( bhiyakhya) .

Style
Early  were sparsely written and contained a number of words of Persian derivation, later works tended to be voluminous and contained  Sanskritised prose.

History 
The , which is the compilation of three authors of the 15th and 16th centuries - Bhagwan, Datta and Keshavacharya - is significant as the earliest attempt at uniting the Marathi-speaking populace against oppressive Bahmani rule.

There are around 200 known , fifty or so of which are considered to be notable, while some others have not been published at all. All the  except for the early works, such as Sabhasad Bakhar, 91 Kalmi Bakhar and the Ajnyapatra Bakhar besides others, are considered to be written between 1760 and 1850 during the heyday of the Peshwas.

At least eleven  have been written principally about Shivaji's life and rule, of which Sabhasad Bakhar, 91 Kalmi Bakhar are the most important, some others being derivations of Sabhasad Bakhar of varying reliability. These have been valuable resource material for historians chronicling Shivali's life and achievements.

List of  

Some of the  include:

Reliability 

Most historians have long neglected as unreliable, due to their colourful literary style with elements of Marathi, Sanskrit aphorisms and Persian administrative jargon. However,  are recently being investigated for their historical content.

Jadunath Sarkar (1870–1958) also described them as "collections of gossip and tradition, sometimes no better than opium-eaters' tales".

References

Maratha Empire
Literary genres
Historiography of India